Kristian Ladewig Lindberg (born 14 February 1994) is a Danish professional footballer who plays as a left winger for Ishøj IF.

Club career

Nordsjælland
Lindberg joined Nordsjælland as a 14-year-old from Hvidovre IF. He made his professional debut on 31 October 2012 in a Danish Cup game against Midtjylland, where he also scored his first goal.

On 1 September 2014, he was sent on a one-season loan to Lyngby.

Atlético Baleares
In August 2015, Lindberg signed a two-year contract with Segunda División B club Atlético Baleares.

He would, however, mostly feature as a substitute for the Spanish club which Lindberg owed the team's tactics rather than his own playing style, and he made nine league appearances.

Roskilde
In September 2016, Lindberg signed with FC Roskilde on a one-year deal. He obtained his playing licence in October. He made his debut on 30 October as a starter in a 2–0 defeat against FC Fredericia.

In January 2017, he extended his contract with Roskilde until December 2018. On 5 March 2017, he scored his first goal for the club in a 4–0 away victory against AB.

Lyngby
On 3 July 2018, it was announced that Lindberg had signed a one-year contract with Lyngby, marking his return to the club.

After leaving Lyngby Boldklub in June 2019, Lindberg returned to FC Roskilde in mid-September on a short deal for the rest of 2019. However, it was confirmed on 10 January 2020, that he had left Roskilde again.

Nykøbing
On 6 September 2020, he joined Nykøbing FC after a successful trial. He made his debut for the club on 6 September in a 1–0 victory against Avarta in the third-tier 2nd Division. His first goal for the club came on 20 November, which proved to be the winner in a 2–1 win over HIK. On 8 January 2021, he extended his contract with Nykøbing until 2022. At the end of the season, Nykøbing achieved promotion back to the second tier by winning the title.

On 4 August 2021, Lindberg scored a hat-trick in the first round of the Danish Cup as Nykøbing knocked out B1908 Amager with a 4–1 final score. In the third round of the cup, Lindberg was an unused substitute as his club shockingly knocked out FC Copenhagen in a 3–0 win. On 25 May 2022, Nykøbing announced the departure of Lindberg, as his contract had come to an end.

ÍA
On 28 June 2022, Lindberg joined Icelandic club ÍA. He left the club at the end of the year.

Ishøj
On 31 January 2023 Lindberg confirmed, that he had joined Danish 3rd Division club Ishøj IF.

International career
Lindberg has represented Denmark at youth international level.

Honours
Atlético Baleares
 Copa Federación de España: 2015–16

References

External links
 
 

1994 births
Living people
Danish men's footballers
Denmark youth international footballers
Denmark under-21 international footballers
Danish expatriate men's footballers
Association football wingers
Hvidovre IF players
FC Nordsjælland players
Lyngby Boldklub players
CD Atlético Baleares footballers
FC Roskilde players
Nykøbing FC players
Íþróttabandalag Akraness players
Ishøj IF players
Danish Superliga players
Danish 1st Division players
Segunda División B players
Danish expatriate sportspeople in Spain
Expatriate footballers in Spain
Danish expatriate sportspeople in Iceland
Expatriate footballers in Iceland
People from Hvidovre Municipality
Sportspeople from the Capital Region of Denmark